Devdas ( Debdash) is a 1979 film based on the Sarat Chandra Chattopadhyay novel, Devdas. The film stars Soumitra Chatterjee, Uttam Kumar, Sumitra Mukherjee, and Supriya Choudhury. The lyrics for the film's songs were written by Kazi Nazrul Islam.

Cast
 Soumitra Chatterjee as Devdas
 Uttam Kumar as Chunnilal
 Supriya Choudhury as Chandramukhi
 Sumitra Mukherjee as Parbati

References

External links
SPICE info 
 

1979 films
Bengali-language Indian films
Devdas films
Films set in Kolkata
1970s Bengali-language films
Films about courtesans in India
Films based on Indian novels
Kazi Nazrul Islam